Brian Michael Smith (born January 29, 1983) is an American actor known for performances on television and advocacy for trans representation in media. His role as Toine Wilkins, a transgender police officer, in Ava DuVernay’s  Queen Sugar, (OWN), launched him into a series of high-profile roles including political strategist Pierce Williams in Showtime's  The L Word: Generation Q (2019) cast. Smith became the first out black trans man in a series regular role on network television when he was cast as firefighter Paul Strickland in FOX's 9-1-1: Lone Star (2020).
Other appearances include NBC's Chicago P.D., HBO's Girls, and Showtime's thriller Homeland.

Early life 
Smith was raised on the east side of Ann Arbor, Michigan by his mother, Ingrid Smith, an event planner and Ford Motor Company employee, with the support of a close-knit family. He and his mother spent his early years living with aunts, cousins, and a brother. Although assigned female at birth, he identified and was perceived as male throughout his childhood. He challenged pressures to conform to his assigned gender role through performance and athletics.

While attending Ann Arbor Pioneer High School, he played defensive end and fullback on the boys football team during the fall, and set records in shot put and pole vaulting on the girls track & field team in the spring. On September 17, 1999, during a game at Traverse City, Smith became the first assigned female at birth athlete to score a varsity touchdown in the State of Michigan.

Career 
Smith studied acting and video production at Kent State University. Upon graduation, he began teaching drama and media literacy to teens until he moved to New York City to pursue a career in acting.

He began training under Terry Knickerbocker at the William Esper Studio in 2011. While studying, he earned featured roles on a few TV shows and a Toyota commercial opposite Eli Manning.

He has also explored the stage, performing stand-up, sketch, and improv comedy as a member of numerous troupes including Gotham City Improv, as well as acting in off-Broadway and regional theater in a handful of plays, including Women Are Crazy Because Men Are A**Holes and Mitch Albom's Duck Hunter Shoots Angel.

In 2015, he earned his first speaking credit in Season 4 of HBO's Girls opposite Jemima Kirke and Adam Driver. This followed with similar roles on TV shows including Blue Bloods, Person of Interest, and Law & Order: SVU.

Queen Sugar 
In 2017, Smith was cast in the role of Officer Antoine "Toine" Wilkins on OWN's series Queen Sugar. Toine is a trans man. Executive-produced by Ava DuVernay and Oprah Winfrey, the Louisiana-set drama focuses on the lives and loves of the estranged Bordelon siblings. The show is based on the novel Queen Sugar by Natalie Baszile.

The role was one of Smith's first opportunities to play a transgender character and explore his own life experiences in his acting. As he has put it:

Toine and Ralph's relationship is much more reflective of the experiences I've had with long-time friends and I hadn't seen that on screen yet. I was excited at the thought of sharing this with people who may not know that they know trans people in their personal life.

In 2018, Ava Duvernay won a GLAAD Excellence in Media Award for her advocacy for inclusion of LGBT people in front of and behind the camera on her projects, particularly for creating Toine Wilkins and casting a transgender actor for the role.

In 2019, Smith was cast Showtime’s drama series The L Word: Generation Q a follow-up to the original hit series, The L Word starring Jennifer Beals, Leisha Hailey and Kate Moennig. Smith played "‘Pierce Williams’ a buttoned-up, fastidious, expert political strategist and a veteran of LA politics. Unlike his colleagues, Williams is not quick to share details about his personal life, choosing to put all his energy into winning campaigns."

9-1-1 Lone Star 

Shortly afterwards Smith made history when he was cast in the Texas set 9-1-1 spinoff “9-1-1: Lone Star starring Rob Lowe. The ensemble procedural chronicling the lives and rescues of the fictional 126 Emergency Service crew features Smith as "‘Paul Strickland,’ a transgender male firefighter with a gift for observation worthy of Sherlock Holmes." With this casting, he became the first out Black Trans man cast as series regular on broadcast TV.

Recognition of his work and physique on the show lead to Smith breaking history as the first out Trans man to be featured in People Magazine's Sexiest Man Alive issue in 2021 and 2022
 Regarding the honor, Smith said,"This level of recognition and visibility as a Trans man is so important to me because again there is a concerted effort across this country and around the globe to legislate Trans and non-binary people out of existence," he said. "But we are here, we are real and we aren't going anywhere. My hope is that my visibility can encourage and empower others who want to be their full selves but are afraid or can't see a future for themselves, to take a step towards being who they are..."

Filmography

Advocacy 

Upon graduating from Kent State, Michael returned to Michigan and began teaching and mentoring youth through filmmaking through the Gear Up Program at the University of Michigan.

In New York, he continued his media literacy and mentoring programs with Wingspan Arts, Maysles Documentary Center and the Tribeca Film Institute's Tribeca Teaches Program. He discovered the importance of community and visibility while he worked with LGBT youth at the Manhattan LGBT Center

On NBC News, Smith said: "I worked with young people and I just saw how important it was for young LGBT people, no matter where they were in their experience, to see what is down the road for them."

Since Queen Sugar, Smith has used his visibility and platforms to advocate for better trans representation in television and film and to encourage LGBTQ youth to create their own media.

In February 2018, he was a special guest and panelist at the University of Michigan's 4th Annual Trotter House Lecture Series, My Life, My Story! Centering the Lives of Trans Voices event alongside Janet Mock and Amiyah Scott.

During NYC Pride he participated in the GLAAD Game Changers Panel in 2018 with Jamie Clayton and Amiyah Scott to discuss the changing landscape of transgender representation in television.
In August 2018, Smith joined Laverne Cox, Trace Lysette, Jen Richards, Alexandra Billings and Chaz Bono in a Variety magazine's first Transgender in Hollywood Roundtable. The hour-long roundtable was released in conjunction with the August 7 print issue dedicated to trans representation and discrimination within Hollywood. During the discussion, Smith said: "We are artists and we want to create things and we want to have choice and our visibility should not cost us that choice."

In addition to public speaking, he continues to advocate through his art and to support trans narratives in television and film by participating in projects such as Sam Feder's documentary, Disclosure: Trans Lives on Screen released on June 19, 2020, by Netflix.

In June 2020, in honor of the 50th anniversary of the first LGBTQ Pride parade, Queerty named him among the fifty heroes “leading the nation toward equality, acceptance, and dignity for all people”.

In July 2021, Smith joined the Human Rights Campaign's Board of Director, the nation's largest Anti-Equality organization to continue to advocate for social and legislative equality and protections for LGBTQ+ people.

References

External links 

 
 

1983 births
African-American activists
21st-century American male actors
African-American male actors
American male television actors
LGBT African Americans
American LGBT actors
LGBT people from Michigan
Living people
Male actors from Michigan
Transgender male actors
Actors from Ann Arbor, Michigan
20th-century African-American people
21st-century LGBT people